Cerodrillia cybele is a species of sea snail, a marine gastropod mollusk in the family Drilliidae.

Description
The size of an adult shell varies between 9 mm and 12 mm.

Distribution
This species occurs in the Pacific Ocean between Mexico and Panama.

References

 Pilsbry, Henry Augustus, and Herbert N. Lowe. "West Mexican and Central American mollusks collected by HN Lowe, 1929–31." Proceedings of the Academy of Natural Sciences of Philadelphia (1932): 33–144.

External links
 

cybele
Gastropods described in 1932